The Brus equation can be used to describe the emission energy of quantum dot semiconductor nanocrystals (such as CdSe nanocrystals) in terms of the band gap energy Egap, Planck's constant h, the radius of the quantum dot r, as well as the effective mass of the excited electron me* and of the excited hole mh*.

The radius of the quantum dot affects the wavelength of the emitted light due to quantum confinement, and this equation describes the effect of changing the radius of the quantum dot on the wavelength λ of the emitted light (and thereby on the emission energy ΔE = hc/λ, where c is the speed of light). This is useful for calculating the radius of a quantum dot from experimentally determined parameters.

The overall equation is

Egap, me*, and mh* are unique for each nanocrystal composition.
For example, with CdSe nanocrystals:

Egap (CdSe) = 1.74 eV = 2.8·10−19 Joules,
me* (CdSe) = 0.13 me = 1.18·10−31 kg,
mh* (CdSe) = 0.45 me = 4.09·10−31 kg.

References

Nanoparticles
Quantum electronics